Prytanes fuscicornis is a species of dirt-colored seed bug in the family Rhyparochromidae. It is found in the Americas.

References

Rhyparochromidae
Articles created by Qbugbot
Insects described in 1874